Russia’s main telecom provider has the necessary capabilities. Russian Internet providers will redirect traffic via Asia in case they are cut off from international exchange points in Europe, Minister of Digital Development, Communications and Mass Media Maksut Shadayev said at an IT event on Tuesday.

Previously the Public Internet exchange points in Russia were MSK-IX in Moscow, Eurasia Peering in Moscow, SPB-IX in Saint-Petersburg, SAMARA-IX in Samara, Ix-NN (Nizhny Novgorod), NSK-IX in Novosibirsk, and KRS-IX in Krasnoyarsk in Kazan and  DataIX in Saint-Petersburg, Moscow, Novosibirsk.

The most popular of these was the MSK-IX, with over 320 members and over 140 Gbit/s steady throughput during peak hours of the weekdays.

On the territory of NSK-IX, RIPE operated a mirror of its k.root-servers.net.

See also 
 Moscow Internet Exchange (MSK-IX)

References

External links 
Official web-sites of public exchanges
 Eurasia Peering
 DataIX Exchange (DataIX)
 Krasnoyarsk Exchange (KRS-IX)
 Ulyanovsk Internet Exchange (ULN-IX)
 South Internet Exchange (SEA-IX)

Internet exchange points
Internet in Russia